Carl Wilhelm Drescher (or Karl Wilhelm Drescher; 12 December 1850 – 8 December 1925) was an Austrian violinist and composer. In Vienna he founded and led a successful salon orchestra, which followed the tradition of the Strauss orchestra.

Life
Drescher was born in Vienna, son of Johann Wilhelm Drescher, a painter, and his wife Anna. As a boy he was in the chorus of the Vienna Court Opera; he later studied singing and violin at the Vienna Conservatory.

From 1869 to 1872 he did military service; afterwards he returned to the Strauss orchestra. Later he was a first violinist in the salon orchestra (Salonkapelle) of Carl Margold, which played classical music and dance music. Drescher was in the orchestra of the Ringtheater at its opening in 1874.

From September 1874 he led his own salon orchestra, "Capelle Amusement", which followed the tradition of the Strauss orchestra. It became very popular, playing in many venues in Vienna, and also playing in Baden-Baden, Berlin and London. In 1900 Drescher was awarded the Salvatormedaille.

He retired in 1920, but made a last appearance in 1925 as conductor at the celebration of 40 years since the composition of the  "Fiakerlied", a popular Viennese song. Drescher died in 1925, and was buried at the Vienna Central Cemetery.

Compositions
Drescher wrote Viennese songs, marches and polkas.

References

External links
 

1850 births
1925 deaths
Musicians from Vienna
19th-century Austrian male musicians
Burials at the Vienna Central Cemetery
Composers from Vienna
19th-century Austrian composers